In a 2005 NASA-sponsored study, it was estimated that the area covered by lawns in the United States to be about , making it the nation's largest irrigated crop by area. Lawn care is thus a popular business in the United States; proper maintenance, construction and management of lawns of various kinds being the focus of much of the modern horticulture industry. Estimates of the amount spent on professional lawn care services vary, but a Harris Survey put the total at $28.9 billion in 2002 (approximately $1,200 per household using such services).
In her book The Lawn: A History of an American Obsession (1994) Virginia Scott Jenkins traces the historic desire to kill weeds. She notes that the current rage for a chemically dependent lawn emerged after World War II and argues that "American front lawns are a symbol of man's control of, or superiority over, his environment."

According to the EPA, "of the 26 billion gallons of water consumed daily in the United States, approximately 7.8 billion gallons, or 30 percent, is devoted to outdoor uses. The majority of this is used for irrigation."

Along with trees, lawns are a vital element in the fight against urban heat islanding.  Lawns provide:
 Oxygen conversion,
 Filtering of air particulates,
 Erosion control,
 Air and surface cooling to offset asphalt, cement, and rooftops,
 A place for recreation and enjoyment.

In comparison to bare dirt, a lawn may be 20 °F cooler on a hot day, and up to 40 °F cooler than cement surfaces.

Lawnmowers
Some companies and brands of lawn mowers in the US include:
The Grasshopper Company
Sensation Lawn Mowers, a commercial lawnmower brand

US lawn mower patents
US patent Lawn mowers
 , Filed April 12, 2000, Issued October 10, 2006. Self-propelled lawn mower [ed., self-propelled lawn mower comprising a microprocessor and at least one cutter]
 , Filed September 11, 1989, Issued October 23, 1990. [ed., remote control lawn mower]
 , Filied March 28, 1910, Issued January 21, 1913 [ed., Stephen Foster Briggs gas engine igniter]
 , Lawn mower. Filed September 8, 1898, Issued May 9, 1899. (ed., John Albert Burr, African-American inventor)
 , Filed September 30, 1878, Issued December 10, 1878. [ed., leaf catcher]
 , Issued May 22, 1877. [ed., leaf catcher]
 , Filed November 28, 1874, Issued January 19, 1875.
  [ed., roller mower]
  [ed. Titled "lawn mower".]

US patent Mowing machines
 
 
 
 , Issued March 12, 1861.

Designs
 , Filed April 24, 1992, Issued May 10, 1994.  [ed., remote control lawn mower design]

Reissued US patent
 , Issued March 16, 1869.

Pesticides 
The idea of lawn landscaping is fairly new with the turfgrass species used in lawns coming to the Americas in the last century. The idea of using chemicals to control a lawn is even newer. Around the 1930s, the use of chemicals to maintain a lawn was advised against. The most common way to control a yard during this time was to either hand pull the weeds or keep chickens. Chemical use became popular in the post-WWII era and has grown significantly since then. In 1999 a study by the United States Geological Survey found that 99% of urban water streams contained pesticides. Surprisingly, pesticides are commonly used by people who understand the negative effects of the chemicals, but they continue to use them due to the immense pressure they feel to maintain their lawn for their neighborhood’s sake. People often view their lawns as a social responsibility that speaks to their character which is why they are willing to use chemicals on their lawns despite the negative effects they may have. Many local governments also do not help this scenario because they have enacted “weed laws” that restrict grass growth over a certain number of inches. According to Robbins and Sharp, these laws are not necessarily the reason many people use chemicals, but they can be a barrier to those who wish to use alternative means of maintaining their lawns.

See also
History of the lawn
Lawn, a town in Taylor County, Texas

References

Further reading
Virginia Scott Jenkins (1994) The Lawn: A History of an American Obsession

External links
 A motor lawn mower - Scientific American 13 November 1897

Gardening in the United States
Lawns